Dennis Sinclair (20 November 1931 – 2011) was an English professional footballer who played in the Football League for Mansfield Town.

References

1931 births
2011 deaths
English footballers
Association football forwards
English Football League players
Derby County F.C. players
Mansfield Town F.C. players